Austinville is an unincorporated community in southwestern Butler County, Iowa, United States.  It lies along Iowa Highway 57 southwest of the city of Allison, the county seat of Butler County.  Its elevation is 1,001 feet (305 m).  Although Austinville is unincorporated, it has a post office with the ZIP code of 50608, which opened on 3 October 1892. In 2022, the population was 100 in town and the surrounding area.

History
Austinville's population was 60 in 1902 and 65 in 1925.

References

Unincorporated communities in Butler County, Iowa
Unincorporated communities in Iowa